Khorshidi may refer to
Khorshidi dynasty in Iran (c.1184–1597)
Alireza Khorshidi (born 1952), Iranian football forward
 Gurak-e Khvorshidi, a village in Iran